Pararrhaptica punctiferana is a moth of the family Tortricidae. It was first described by Lord Walsingham in 1907. It is endemic to the Hawaiian islands of Molokai, Maui and Hawaii.

External links

Archipini
Endemic moths of Hawaii